Performing Chicken is an EP by Money Mark released on Fido Speaks/Love Kit Records  in 1994 as a 10" mini-album. The tracks on this release also comprise the first portion of his later album, Mark's Keyboard Repair.

Track listing

Crater Side

A1	Sunday, Gardena Blvd.	
A2	Insects Are All Around Us	
A3	Three Movements For The Wind: Theme For The Innocent Hostage	
A4	Three Movements For The Wind: Poets Walk	
A5	Three Movements For The Wind: Spooky	
A6	Cry	

Chicken Side

B1	Pretty Pain	
B2	No Fighting	
B3	Ba Ba Ba Boom	
B4	Have Clav Will Travel	
B5	Don't Miss The Boat

References

1994 EPs
Money Mark albums